Brescia University College is a Catholic liberal arts women's college located in London, Ontario, Canada.  Affiliated with the University of Western Ontario, Brescia is the only university-level women's college in Canada. It has approximately 1,500 undergraduate students and a 14:1 student/faculty ratio. Although Brescia is a Catholic institution, it accepts students of all faiths and backgrounds.

History
Brescia was founded in 1919 as Ursuline College by the Ursulines, an organization of women of Catholic faith. It was originally located in an old converted house at 556 Wellington Street in downtown London, Ontario. It was founded as a Roman Catholic affiliate of the University of Western Ontario in London, Ontario, and the graduates received University of Western Ontario degrees. The first class was of seven young women who each paid $50 for tuition.

The Ursuline Superior General, Mother Clare Gaukler, bought a piece of land at 1285 Western Road in London, and construction began on a permanent building in 1923.  The building was built by contractor Joseph Michael Piggot, opened for classes and residence in 1925, and was named Brescia Hall.  Brescia Hall was later renamed "Ursuline Hall".

Brescia was known as a liberal arts school and the courses taught were: English, French, Spanish, Philosophy, History, Classics, and Religious Knowledge. Brescia students took other courses such as Science, Mathematics, Political Economy at Western. Over time, Brescia adapted some of the courses (e.g., Philosophy) to be appropriate for Catholic women. In 1936, a Home Economics program was begun, it evolved into what is known today as the Department of Food and Nutritional Sciences.

Ursuline College was renamed "Brescia College" in 1963, after the Italian city of Brescia where the Ursuline religious institute was founded. In 2001 it was again renamed to "Brescia University College".

In September 2007, Brescia started the first graduate program.  In 2017, the college began offering a degree in non-profit management.

Programs

Bachelor of Arts (English, French, Psychology, Sociology, Family Studies, Health Sciences, Kinesiology, Philosophy, Religious Studies, Community Development, Political Science, Human Ecology, and Leadership Studies)
Bachelor of Management & Organizational Studies (Food Management & Marketing, Accounting, Nonprofit Management, and Consumer Behaviour)
Bachelor of Science (Foods & Nutrition and Human Ecology)
Master of Foods and Nutritional Sciences
Master of Engineering in Food Processing (MEng)
Diploma in Dietetic Education & Practical Training
Diploma in Management Studies
Diploma in Diversity and Families
Certificate in Community Development
Certificate in Diversity and Families

The Honours Bachelor of Science in Foods and Nutrition at Brescia is accredited by Dietitians of Canada, making graduates eligible to apply for dietetic internship placements.

Brescia offers a Master of Foods and Nutritional Sciences program, which is divided into two streams: The internship MSc stream, available to those who have graduated from a programme accredited by Dietitians of Canada, combines a master's degree with an internship and graduates can write the exam needed to become a registered dietitian.  The second stream is for people who are already a Registered Dietitian in Canada.

Brescia also offers a Preliminary Year, a co-educational one-year university preparatory program taught by university professors on the College campus. The College also offers an English as a Second Language programme called  CultureWorks.

Student life
The Preliminary Year programme and the Masters of Science are co-education; all undergraduate programs are women-only. However, all courses are accessible to UWO students, male or female, including students from Western's two other affiliated university colleges.

Buildings
James Carlisle Pennington designed Brescia Hall (1924–25) for the Ursuline Sisters, near Western Road at Sarnia Road, on the campus of the University of Western Ontario. The Mother St. James memorial building (completed in 1963) is the main building on campus; it houses classrooms, offices, student services, the business office, the Beryl Ivey Library and computer lab, the Mother St. James Memorial Auditorium and The Hive. Ursuline Hall was Brescia's original building and residence, but now houses classrooms, food laboratories and administrative offices. In September 2013, Brescia opened its new residence building and dining pavilion, Clare Hall, which houses just over 300 students and includes an eatery called the Mercato.

Notable alumnae
Margaret Chan - 7th Director General of the World Health Organization (BA 1973)
Beryl Ivey, CM - Philanthropist  (BA 1947)

See also

Books
 Murray Llewellyn Barr A century of medicine at Western: a centennial history of the Faculty of Medicine, University of Western Ontario (London: University of Western Ontario, 1977), 
 John R. W. Gwynne-Timothy Western's first century (London: University of Western Ontario, 1978)
 Ruth Davis Talman 'The beginnings and development of the University of Western Ontario, 1878-1924.' (MA Thesis, University of Western Ontario, 1925)
 Available from the Beryl Ivey Library are Emeritus Professor of History Dr. Patricia Skidmore's books Brescia College 1919-1979 and The History of Brescia

References

External links
Official Website

University of Western Ontario
Educational institutions established in 1919
Women's universities and colleges in Canada
Buildings and structures in London, Ontario
Catholic universities and colleges in Canada
1919 establishments in Ontario
Ursuline colleges and universities
Liberal arts colleges
Women in Ontario